Sint Maarten has 51 designated monuments. The first objects were given this protected status in 2005.

Dutch Cul de Sac
Dutch Cul de Sac has 5 designated monuments

 

 

 

 

 

|}

Little Bay
Little Bay has 2 designated monuments

 

 

|}

Lower Prince's Quarter
Lower Prince's Quarter has 4 designated monuments

 

 

 

 

|}

Philipsburg
Philipsburg has 33 designated monuments

 

 

 

 

 

 

 

 

 

 

 

 

 

 

 

 

 

 

 

 

 

 

 

 

 

 

 

 

 

 

 

 

 

|}

Simpson Bay
Simpson Bay has 5 designated monuments

 

 

 

 

 

|}

Upper Prince's Quarter
Upper Prince's Quarter has 2 designated monuments

 

 

|}

References

 
designated monuments